Kamboja may refer to:

Kambojas, an ancient tribe of Transoxiana and the Paropamisus in Iron Age India
Kamboja-Pala Dynasty of Bengal
Kamboj, a clan of South Asia

See also
Kamma
Cambodia
Kumbhoj, a town in Kolhapur district
Cambyses I, (Old Persian: Kambūjia) father of Cyrus the Great
Cambyses II of Persia, (Old Persian: Kambūjia) son of Cyrus the Great